Bob Both (born 1952) is an American recording engineer and record producer, best known for his work with James Brown in the 1970s.

Both was born in Bloomfield, New Jersey, the son of a carpenter. Inspired by The Beatles, he learned to play the guitar at age 11 and started his first band in the 8th grade. He also started writing songs and making simple recordings on a home tape recorder by age 14. Throughout high school Both continued writing songs and playing in bands.

When he graduated from high school he attended The Ridgewood School of Art and studied to become a commercial artist.  In his second year of school his strong interest in music led him to quit art school and search for a job in the music business.

At age 19, armed with nothing little more than a letter of recommendation from one of his art teachers, he landed a job as A&R assistant to Peter K. Seigel at Polydor Records, NYC. There Both learned the basics of record production from Seigel and the fundamentals of record mastering from Bob Ludwig who was a mastering engineer at Sterling Sound. He also began to develop his engineering skills producing mixes for James Brown.

In 1972, he became James Brown's recording engineer, A&R director and production supervisor. He worked on 11 of Brown's albums including the number one hits  "Get on the Good Foot",  "The Payback", "My Thang" and "Doing It to Death" with Fred Wesley & the J.B.s (Brown's backup band). Both also recorded records for artists signed to Brown's production company including Hank Ballard, Maceo Parker, Lyn Collins, Bobby Byrd, Vicki Anderson and others.  Both left Brown in 1977 and opened his own studio, Twain Recording, in New Jersey.  He has done recordings for thousands of bands in the New York, New Jersey and Pennsylvania areas such as Stephanie White & The Philth Harmonic, The Antics], The Insomniacs, Bonjee, The Disconnects, Crazy & The Brains, Mythology, Dan Sheehan Conspiracy and many others.. Both has also had years of experience recording punk rock/hardcore bands. New Jersey punk/hardcore producer Mark "The Mutha" Chesley recorded the bulk of Mutha Records catalog at Twain Recording including The Worst, Chronic Sick, Secret Syde, Tribulation, Youth in Asia, Stisism, Lost in Aggression, Fatal Rage and many more. Producer Marty Munsch of Punk Rock Records has also recorded many notable projects with Bob, including Dead Heros (featuring Discharge vocalist Jeff Janiak, U.S. Chaos, The Vote, The New York Rel-X, Broken Heroes, The Flare Ups, The Stun Gunz, Terabithia, to name just a few.

Both worked closely with Harry Weinger of Polygram Records catalog development on the re-issue of many of James Browns classic seventies albums on CD throughout the 1990s. In 1993 Both began teaching audio production courses at Ramapo College of NJ. In 1995 he also started teaching audio courses at William Paterson University, NJ. Both recorded the drumming technique DVD Soul of the Funky Drummers with Clyde Stubblefield and Jabo Starks in 1999 and recorded the Accelerate Your Playing DVD series for The Berklee Press in 2000. 2007 saw Bob once again reuniting with Fred Wesley to record "Funk For Your Ass" for Columbia Music.  Both's work is cited in several books including The Billboard Book of Number One Rhythm & Blues Hits and Hit Me, Fred, Fred Wesley's biography. Both has written articles on recording techniques for magazines including EQ, REP, Soundtrack, Pro Music and others. He has received RIAA gold record awards for several of his James Brown recordings and is listed in The Marquis Who's Who in Entertainment.

Currently Both continues to operate Twain Recording, engineering and producing records in rock, R&B, alternative and a variety of other musical styles. He performs several times a month playing guitar in a classic rock band just for the fun of making music.

References

External links
 Video Interview with Bob Both
 https://www.youtube.com/watch?v=C1EIUoJl710
 http://www.theaquarian.com/2010/12/22/from-the-console-over-the-mountain/
 http://www.allmusic.com/artist/bob-both-mn0000760616/credits
 https://soundbetter.com/profiles/9140-bob-both

1952 births
Record producers from New Jersey
American audio engineers
People from Bloomfield, New Jersey
Living people
Engineers from New Jersey